Bert Andrews may refer to:

Bert Andrews (photographer) (1929–1993), American photographer
Bert Andrews (journalist) (1901–1953), American journalist